Mullingar Shamrocks is a Gaelic Athletic Association club located in the town of Mullingar  in County Westmeath, Ireland.

History
The team was founded in 1953 and participates in both men's and women's leagues.

Honours
 Westmeath Senior Football Championships: (12)
 1964, 1966, 1986, 1987, 1990, 1992, 1993, 1994, 1995, 2000, 2012, 2018
 Westmeath Intermediate Football Championships: (1)
 1988

Notable players and club members
 Paddy Flanagan
 Barry Kelly

References

External links
 
 

Gaelic games clubs in County Westmeath
1953 establishments in Ireland